Impressions! is the third album by saxophonist Paul Horn and his first released on the World Pacific label in 1959.

Reception

The Allmusic site rated the album 3 stars.

Track listing
All compositions by Paul Horn except as indicated
 "Maid with the Flaxen Hair" (Claude Debussy) - 2:15
 "The Little Shepherd" (Debussy) - 1:55
 "Berceuse" (Igor Stravinsky) - 3:10
 "Pavane for a Dead Princess" (Maurice Ravel) - 1:26
 "Waltz #2 &  #3" - 3:46
 "Greensleeves" (Traditional) - 4:32
 "Baltimore Oriole" (Hoagy Carmichael, Paul Francis Webster) - 3:27
 "Mist" - 3:30
 "Good Bait" (Tadd Dameron, Count Basie) - 4:54
 "Green Dolphin Street" (Bronisław Kaper, Ned Washington) - 5:53

Personnel
Paul Horn - alto saxophone, flute, clarinet
John Pisano - guitar
Gene Estes - vibraphone
Lyle Ritz - bass

References

World Pacific Records albums
Paul Horn (musician) albums
1959 albums